Ray Griffiths (born 26 September 1931) is a Welsh footballer, who played as a wing half in the Football League for Chester.

References

Chester City F.C. players
Association football wing halves
English Football League players
Living people
1931 births
Footballers from Llanelli
Welsh footballers